Acleris salicicola is a species of moth of the family Tortricidae. It is found in the Russian Far East (the Kuriles) and Japan.

The wingspan is about 22 mm.

The larvae feed on Salix sachalinensis.

References

Moths described in 1970
salicicola
Moths of Asia
Moths of Japan